Zinédine Ould Khaled (born 14 January 2000) is a French professional footballer who plays as a midfielder for Ligue 1 club Angers SCO.

Club career
Ould Khaled made his professional debut with Angers in a 2–0 Ligue 1 win over Nantes on 7 March 2020.

Personal life
Born in France, Ould Khaled is of Algerian descent. He was named after the French footballer Zinedine Zidane.

References

External links
 
 FFF Profile
 

Living people
2000 births
Footballers from Val-de-Marne
French footballers
French sportspeople of Algerian descent
Association football midfielders
Angers SCO players
Ligue 1 players
Championnat National 2 players
Championnat National 3 players
People from Alfortville